The Navy Justice Series consists of five novels, authored by Don Brown  and published by Zondervan Publishing Company, and its parent publishing company, HarperCollins Publishing Company between 2005 and 2010. The novels, which fit mostly in the military-legal genre, are Treason (2005), Hostage (2005), Defiance (2007), Black Sea Affair (2008) and Malacca Conspiracy (2010). In 2013, film students at Montreat College in Black Mountain, North Carolina, under the direction of Professor Jim Shores, began work on adapting the Navy Justice Series for television. In 2010, Defiance, Treason and Hostage were named by Online Universities among the 50 Best Legal Novels for Both Lawyers and Laymen.

Treason
The storyline of Treason features a young Navy JAG officer, Zack Brewer, who prosecutes three Islamic chaplains in a fictional court-martial for various crimes under the Uniform Code of Military Justice. In the storyline, the three members of the Navy Chaplain Corps, all defendants in the court-martial, have incited sailors and marines to acts of terrorism and Lieutenant Zack Brewer has been chosen to prosecute them for treason and murder.

Hostage
Hostage is the second novel in the Navy Justice series. Like the novel Treason, Hostage also features the life and adventures of a young Navy JAG officer, Zack Brewer. In Hostage, Brewer appears with his co-counsel, Lieutenant Wendy Poole, in a case before the United States Supreme Court in a case to determine the application of the death penalty.

Defiance

Defiance is a 2007 legal-thriller/political thriller. It is the third novel in the Navy Justice series, featuring JAG Officers Zack Brewer and Diane Colcernian.

Black Sea Affair

Black Sea Affair is a submarine thriller set largely in the Black Sea and in the waters around Europe.

Malacca Conspiracy
Malacca Conspiracy is a naval thriller set largely in the Malacca Straits and in the waters around Indonesia and Malaysia. The novel is set in part on the now-decommissioned U.S. frigate , and in 2011, the author autographed copies of the novel for the ship's officers and crew, on her return to Pearl Harbor on one of her last cruises. The novel has been reviewed by several national publications, including Publishers Weekly and World Magazine.

References

American thriller novels
Thriller novel series